Smbat Margaryan (born March 17, 1993, in Yerevan, Armenia) is an Armenian weightlifter.

Margaryan won a bronze medal at the 2010 Summer Youth Olympics.

References

External links 
 Smbat Margaryan at Lift Up

1993 births
Living people
Sportspeople from Yerevan
Armenian male weightlifters
Weightlifters at the 2010 Summer Youth Olympics
European Weightlifting Championships medalists
21st-century Armenian people